Shahrokh Zamani was an Iranian union activist. 
Shahrokh Zamani was born in Tabriz, the capital of Iran's East Azerbaijan Province, in 1963. He died on September 13, 2015 due to the consequences of long-term hunger strikes while imprisoned at Rajaee Shahr Prison. He was a member of the provisional board for reopening of House-Painter Workers’ Union and the Follow-up Committee to Set-up Free Labor Organizations and was a communist and revolutionary labour right activist from the people of Azerbaijan who was imprisoned in Rajai Shahr prison, died at 3 PM on September 13 2015 in Rajai Shahr prison because of a stroke. He has already been arrested several times because of his activism in defending the workers’ rights, especially the right to provide social insurance and unemployment insurance for dyers. He was arrested again in the city of Tabriz, on June 8, 2011, on charges of “inciting against the regime. He was sentenced to 11 years in jail, and was retired in September 2013, in a sham trial on charges of “insulting the leader, and was sentenced to extra 6 months in jail. “Shahrokh Zamani” was unjustly jailed after trials lacking justice, and killed as a prisoner in the custody of Iranian authorities. The Iranian authorities hold the legal responsibility for the murder of activist Shahrukh Zamani, whereas he was killed inside the prisons of those authorities, and there is strong evidence that refers to the possibility of his assassination, including his diary, in which he wrote that he was being threatened with death by using poison or by prisoners motivated by the intelligence service.

In 2014, Zamani wrote a letter to U.N. Special Rapporteur Ahmed Shaheed complaining about his mistreatment. “The Supreme Court clerk who reviewed my case said [there was] not a single legal argument that a judge could have relied on in my file to [support] a conviction. My wife was told there’s no point in trying to get justice for my case at the Islamic Human Rights office, and that the decision-makers are elsewhere,” he wrote.

This labor activist formerly had been arrested in 1993, on charges of illegal activities in the painters’ union and was imprisoned for about 18 months.

Shahrokh Zamani, a member of the Board of Directors and the Board Committee for the Establishment of Independent Trade Unions to Reopen the Union of Construction Workers and Painters, was held in political prisoners’ ward in Rajai Shahr prison, serving his fifth year of imprisonment without any leave.

See also
Human rights in Iran

References

2015 deaths
Iranian dissidents
Iranian human rights activists
Iranian activists
Human rights abuses in Iran
Iranian people who died in prison custody
Hunger strikers